A macrocell or macrosite is a cell in a mobile phone network that provides radio coverage served by a high power cell site (tower, antenna or mast).  Generally, macrocells provide coverage larger than microcell. The antennas for macrocells are mounted on ground-based masts, rooftops and other existing structures, at a height that provides a clear view over the surrounding buildings and terrain. Macrocell base stations have power outputs of typically tens of watts. Macrocell performance can be increased by increasing the efficiency of the transceiver.

Scale 
The term macrocell is used to describe the widest range of cell sizes. Macrocells are found in rural areas or along highways. Over a smaller cell area, a microcell is used in a densely populated urban area. Picocells are used for areas smaller than microcells, such as a large office, a mall, or train station. Currently the smallest area of coverage that can be implemented with a femtocell is a home or small office.

See also 
 Cellular network
 Femtocell
 GSM
 Microcell
 Picocell
 Small Cells

References

External links 
 Mobile Phones: Jargon Explained
 White Paper: The Business Case for Metrocells
 How To Install A Cell Phone Tower

Mobile telecommunications